Jean Louisa Kelly (born 1972) is an American actress.

Jean Kelly may also refer to:

 Jean Kelly, a participant in the Irish TV series Operation Transformation
 Jean Kelly, a character in the American TV series Grace Under Fire

See also 
 Gene Kelly (1912–1996), American actor and dancer
 Jeanne Kelly (1915–1963), American actress
 Jean-Baptiste Kelly (1783–1854), Canadian Catholic priest